Desmiphora cucullata is a species of beetle in the family Cerambycidae. It was described by Thomson in 1868. It is known from Argentina, Brazil, Paraguay, and Uruguay.

References

Desmiphora
Beetles described in 1868